Nicky Jamieson (born 3 August 1996) is a Scottish professional footballer who plays as a defender for Stenhousemuir. He spent five years at Largs Thistle, before playing for Queen's Park and Alloa Athletic for one season each.

Club career

Largs Thistle 
Jamieson spent the first five years of his career at Largs Thistle after leaving the Greenock Morton youth academy. During his five years at the club Jamieson made over one hundred and fifty appearances for the Junior side.

Queen's Park 
In June 2019 Jamieson completed a move to Scottish League Two side Queen's Park, in his only year with 'The Spiders' he made the league's Team of the Season.

Alloa Athletic 
On 22 July 2020 Jamieson signed for Scottish Championship outfit Alloa Athletic ahead of the 2020–21 season.

Stenhousemuir 

Start of season 2021-22 Jamieson signed a loan deal from Alloa Athletic In January 2022, Jamieson signed a permanent contract until summer 2023. In February 2022, he picked up cinch League 2 Player of the Month. At the conclusion of season 2021-22 Jamieson was named as Stenhousemuir Player of the Year.

Career statistics

References 

Scottish footballers
1996 births
Living people
Alloa Athletic F.C. players
Scottish Professional Football League players
Association football defenders
Queen's Park F.C. players
Largs Thistle F.C. players
Greenock Morton F.C. players
Stenhousemuir F.C. players